Georgia State Route 15 Loop may refer to:

 Georgia State Route 15 Loop (Baldwin–Cornelia): a former loop route of State Route 15 that existed in Baldwin and Cornelia
 Georgia State Route 15 Loop (Tallulah Falls): a loop route of State Route 15 that exists in Tallulah Falls

015 Loop